Mars Williams (born May 29, 1955) is an American jazz and rock saxophonist. Exposed to big band and dixieland jazz by his trumpet-playing father, Williams played classical clarinet for ten years, then migrated to saxophone in his last year of high school, citing the influence of Eric Dolphy, John Coltrane, and Charlie Parker. He attended De Paul University and later the Association for the Advancement of Creative Musicians where he studied under founders Anthony Braxton and Roscoe Mitchell. In 2004 he was selected by the Moers Festival as their featured artist.

Williams is a musician, orchestrator, and arranger who has played with The Waitresses and The Psychedelic Furs. He was only to tour with The Furs in Australia for a month in 1983 as then sax-player Gary Windo was unable to make the trip. After a successful tour and the breakup of the Waitresses, he was asked to stay on as a permanent member, which he did until 1989 and later rejoined in 2005. He has also performed with Billy Idol, the Power Station, Billy Squier, Massacre, Ministry, and Die Warzau and the Ike Reilly Assassination.

He has toured and recorded with the Peter Brötzmann Tentet, the Vandermark 5, Cinghiale, Our Daughter's Wedding, and Mark Freeland's Electroman, and is the bandleader of several spin-off jazz groups: Grammy Award nominated, acid jazz pioneer Liquid Soul, Hal Russell's NRG Ensemble, Witches & Devils, Slam, and XmarsX. He is active in the Chicago improvisational jazz underground scene both individually and as a member of the quartet Extraordinary Popular Delusions.

Discography

As leader/co-leader
Eftsoons (Nessa, 1981 [1985]) with Hal Russell
 Cinghiale: Hoofbeats of the Snorting Swine (Eight Day, 1996) with Ken Vandermark
 Witches & Devils: At the Empty Bottle (Knitting Factory, 2000)
 Moments Form (Idyllic Noise, 2013)

With Boneshaker (Mars Williams, Paal Nilssen-Love, Kent Kessler)
 Boneshaker (Trost, 2012)
 Unusual Words (Soul What, 2014)
 Thinking Out Loud (Trost, 2017)
 Fake Music (Soul What, 2019)

With the NRG Ensemble
 Calling All Mothers (Quinnah, 1994)
 This Is My House (Delmark, 1996)
 Bejazzo Gets a Facelift (Atavaistic, 1998)

With Liquid Soul
 Liquid Soul (1995)
 Make Some Noise (1998)
 Here's the Deal (2000)
 Evolution (2002)
 One-Two Punch (2006)

As sideman
With Harrison Bankhead
 Morning Sun/Harvest Moon (Engine, 2011)
 Velvet Blue (Engine, 2013)

With Hal Russell / NRG Ensemble
 Elixir (Atavistic, 1979 [2001])
 Hal on Earth (Abduction, 1989)
 The Finnish/Swiss Tour (ECM, 1991)
 The Hal Russell Story (ECM, 1993)

With Ken Vandermark
 Standards (Quinnah, 1995)
 Barrage Double Trio: Utility Hitter (Quinnah, 1996)
 Vandermark 5: Single Piece Flow (Atavistic, 1997)
 Vandermark 5: Target or Flag (Atavistic, 1998)

With The Swollen Monkeys
 Afterbirth of the Cool  (Cachalot, 1981) produced by Hal Willner

References

1955 births
Living people
American jazz saxophonists
American male saxophonists
American rock saxophonists
The Psychedelic Furs members
The Waitresses members
People from Elmhurst, Illinois
21st-century saxophonists
Jazz musicians from Illinois
American male jazz musicians
NRG Ensemble members
Atavistic Records artists
Delmark Records artists